Santo Antônio de Lisboa is a district of the city of Florianópolis, the state capital of Santa Catarina in Brazil.

It is known for having strong Azorian culture due to the immigration in the 19th century. 

The seat of the district is Santo Antônio de Lisboa.  The neighbourhoods of the district include:

Barra de Sambaqui
Cacupé
Sambaqui

References

Neighbourhoods in Florianópolis
Beaches of Florianópolis